Monrad Charles Wallgren (April 17, 1891September 18, 1961) was an American politician who served as the 13th governor of Washington from 1945 to 1949, as well as representing that state in the United States House of Representatives and the United States Senate.

Wallgren, of Swedish descent, was born in Des Moines, Iowa in 1891. His family moved to Texas in 1894 and then to Everett, Washington in 1901. He attended public schools and business college in Everett, graduating from the Washington State School of Optometry in Spokane, Washington in 1914. He worked in retail jewelry and optometry from 1915 to 1932, as well as serving in the Washington National Guard from 1917 to 1919 and 1921 to 1922. He was an outstanding player of carom billiards.

In 1932, Wallgren ran for election to the United States House of Representatives as a Democrat.  He defeated incumbent Republican Albert Johnson, and took office in the 73rd United States Congress on March 4, 1933. Near the end of his fourth term in 1940, Wallgren ran for United States Senate to replace fellow Democrat Lewis B. Schwellenbach, who was retiring to accept a judicial nomination. Wallgren won the election, and was also appointed to finish the rest of Schwellenbach's term. He took office on December 19, 1940.

While Wallgren served portions of two different terms (the end of Schwellenbach's and the one that Wallgren was elected to), he served less than 6 years in the Senate. In 1944, he successfully ran for Governor of Washington against incumbent Republican Arthur B. Langlie, resigning from the Senate on January 9, 1945 to serve as governor from then until 1949. He was defeated for re-election as governor by Langlie in 1948, and was nominated by President Harry Truman as the chairman of the National Security Resources Board. That nomination was later withdrawn, and Wallgren served on the Federal Power Commission in 1950 and 1951. He then retired from public service.

In 1961, Wallgren died of complications resulting from a traffic accident.

References

External links
Wallgren, Monrad Charles at HistoryLink
 Congressional biography

1891 births
1961 deaths
Politicians from Des Moines, Iowa
American people of Swedish descent
Democratic Party members of the United States House of Representatives from Washington (state)
Democratic Party United States senators from Washington (state)
Democratic Party governors of Washington (state)
Politicians from Everett, Washington
Politicians from Spokane, Washington
Federal Power Commission
American carom billiards players
Three-cushion billiards players
20th-century American politicians
American optometrists
Road incident deaths in Washington (state)
Truman administration personnel